The CookieMonster attack is a man-in-the-middle exploit where a third party can gain HTTPS cookie data when the "Encrypted Sessions Only" property is not properly set. This could allow access to sites with sensitive personal or financial information.

It is a Python based tool, developed by security researcher Mike Perry.

Perry originally announced the vulnerability exploited by CookieMonster on BugTraq in 2007. A year later, he demonstrated CookieMonster as a proof of concept tool at Defcon 16.

Users of the World Wide Web can reduce their exposure to CookieMonster attacks by avoiding websites that are unprotected to these attacks. Certain web browsers make it possible for the user to establish which sites these are. For example, users of the Firefox browser can go to the Privacy tab in the Preferences window, and click on 'Show Cookies.' For a given site, inspecting the individual cookies for the top level name of the site, and any subdomain names, will reveal if 'Send For: Encrypted connections only,' has been set. If it has, the user can test for the site's vulnerability to CookieMonster attacks by deleting these cookies and visiting the site again. If the site still allows the user in, the site is vulnerable to CookieMonster attacks.

Affected websites 
Websites allegedly affected by CookieMonster included:

 Google services including: Gmail, Blogger, Google Docs, Google Finance and search history
 Airline/Travel websites: Southwest, United, Expedia, USAirways.com, priceline.com
 Banks: National City, USAA, Patelco, CapitalOne
 Domain Registrars: Register.com, namesecure.com
 Merchants: eBay, wireless.att.com, Netflix, Newegg

See also 

 HTTP cookie § Cookie theft and session hijacking
 Session hijacking

References

External links
Perry's Defcon Presentation (YouTube)
https://fscked.org/proj/cookiemonster/ActiveHTTPSCookieStealing.pdf - Defcon Presentation slides
 http://fscked.org/blog/cookiemonster-core-logic-configuration-and-readmes

Web security exploits